Stelgidopteryx (Baird, 1858) is a small genus of swallows. It contains two species:

Adults of both species are brown on top with lighter underparts and a slightly forked tail. They nest in cavities but do not excavate their holes or form colonies.

These birds forage in flight over water or fields, usually flying low. They eat insects.

"Rough-winged" refers to the serrated edge feathers on the wing of this genus; this feature would only be apparent in the hand.

References 

 
Bird genera

Taxa named by Spencer Fullerton Baird